Farrar may refer to:

 Cape Farrar, a headland on the Boothia Peninsula in Nunavut, Canada
 Farrar, Georgia, a US unincorporated community
 Farrar, Iowa, a US unincorporated community
 Farrar Landing, Michigan, an unincorporated community
 Farrar, Missouri, a US unincorporated community
 Farrar, North Carolina, a US unincorporated community
 Farrar, Northern Territory, a suburb in Australia
 Farrar, Texas, a US unincorporated community
 Farrar Hill, Tennessee, a US unincorporated community
 Farrar's Island, a peninsula on the James River in Virginia
 River Farrar, Scotland
 Farrar (album), a 2008 album by Scottish fiddler Duncan Chisholm
 Farrar (surname), people with the surname Farrar

See also
 Farrar & Rinehart, former name of American publishing firm Rinehart & Company
 Farrar, Straus and Giroux, American publishing firm
 Marvin, Welch & Farrar, 1970s British and Australian music group
 Farrer (disambiguation)
 Ferrar